The Monkey Man of New Delhi (English: The Face Scratcher, Hindi: मुंहनोचवा, Urdu: منھ نوچوا) aka Kaala Bandar is an unknown anomaly which was reported to be roaming Delhi in mid-2001. The entire incident has been described as an example of mass hysteria in India.

History 
In May 2001, reports began to circulate in the Indian capital New Delhi around a strange monkey-like creature that was appearing at night and attacking people. Eyewitness accounts were often inconsistent, but tended to describe the creature as about four feet (120 cm) tall, covered in thick black hair, with a metal helmet, metal claws, glowing red eyes and three buttons on its chest. Some reports also claim that the monkey-man wore roller-skates. Others, however, described the Monkey-man as having a more vulpine snout, and being up to eight feet tall, and muscular; it would leap from building to building.
Over 350 sightings of the Kala Bandar were reported, as well as around 60 resulting injuries. Two (by some reports, three) people even died when they leapt from the tops of buildings or fell down stairwells in a panic caused by what they thought was the attacker. At one point, exasperated police even issued artist's impression drawings in an attempt to catch the creature.

In popular culture

Film 
 The appearance of Monkey Man in Old Delhi is the centre-point of the 2009 Bollywood Hindi film Delhi-6 directed by Rakeysh Omprakash Mehra. In the film, the creature, called in Hindi as "Kala Bandar (Black Monkey)" is used as an allegory to represent the evil that resides inside every man alongside God (virtue). The monkey man has never actually been caught on tape.

Television 
 In 2012, the Hindi TV series Mrs. Kaushik Ki Paanch Bahuein featured a story track around the mystery of "Kala Bandar" (Black Monkey).

Music 
 The Monkey Man is referenced in track 12 "Mysterious Man-Monkey" from American cello rock band Rasputina's 2011 album Great American Gingerbread: Rasputina Rarities & Neglected Items.

Print media 
 In the 2011 graphic novel Munkeeman by Tere Bin Laden director Abhishek Sharma, the creature is interpreted as a misunderstood superhero, who was the result of a science experiment gone wrong. The first edition, Munkeeman Vol 1 chronicled the creatures brief appearance in Delhi, and the second edition will feature the creature in Kanpur, based on the incidents reported in February 2002.

See also 
 Vanara
 Superstition
 Spring-Heeled Jack
 Bukit Timah Monkey Man
 Urban legend
 Hanuman

References

External links 
 Sanal Edamaruku's first hand report on Monkey man
 
 Time article about the Monkey man
 Strangemag story
 Verma SK, Srivastava DK. A study on mass hysteria (monkey men?) victims in East Delhi. Indian J Med Sci 2003;57:355-60

New Delhi
Culture of Delhi
History of Delhi (1947–present)
Urban legends
Mass psychogenic illness
2000s in Delhi
Indian legendary creatures
Mythological monsters
Asian ghosts
Reportedly haunted locations in India
Paranormal places in India
Superstitions of India
Indian folklore
Indian legends
Mass excitability in South Asian culture